Melling is a surname. Notable people with the surname include:

 Al Melling, British automobile designer
 Antoine Ignace Melling (1763–1831), Ottoman painter
 Gerald Melling, New Zealand architect and writer
 Harry Melling (NASCAR) (1945–1999), American businessman
 Chris Melling, World class pool player
 Harry Melling (actor), (born 1989), English actor
 O.R. Melling, pen-name of G.V. Whelan, Canadian writer
 William Melling, British actor

Fictional characters:
 Victor Melling, character in the film Miss Congeniality